The boys' doubles tournament of the 2022 European Junior Badminton Championships was held from 22 to 27 August. William Kryger Boe and Mads Vestergaard from Denmark clinched this title in the last edition.

Seeds 
Seeds were announced on 5 August.

  Jakob Houe / Christian Faust Kjær
  Mael Cattoen / Lucas Renoir
  Jonathan Dresp / Kenneth Neumann
  Daniel Franco / Ruben Garcia 

  Jarne Schlevoigt / Nikolaj Stupplich 
  Volodymyr Koluzaiev / Nikita Yeromenko (second round)
  Alessandro Gozzini / Luca Zhou 
  Natan Begga / Baptiste Labarthe

Draw

Finals

Top half

Section 1

Section 2

References

External links 
Draw

2022 European Junior Badminton Championships